Ndue is an Albanian masculine given name and may refer to:
Ndue Marashi (1933–1975), Albanian politician, former mayor of Tirana 
Ndue Mujeci (born 1993), Albanian footballer
Ndue Paluca (born 1966), Albanian politician
Ndue Përlleshi (1908–1949), Kosovar-Albanian military leader, local and national hero
Ndue Ukaj (born 1977). Albanian writer, publicist, literary critic and literary theorist

References

Albanian masculine given names